Shigeru Sugita is a Japanese bodybuilding champion who, in 1976, became the first Japanese bodybuilder to win the  Mr. Universe competition.

Biographical

At the 1976 Universe Championships, Sugita finished first place in the short class and was the overall winner. On the day of the competition Sugita and two fellow countrymen and contestants, Kozo Sudo and Masashi Enomoto, posed for photographs in London's Hyde Park Square, an event which caused much interest to passers-by, who lined up along the fences to watch.

List of competitions

References

Japanese bodybuilders
Living people
Year of birth missing (living people)
Place of birth missing (living people)